Nikita Baranovsky Contini (born 21 May 1996) is a Ukrainian professional footballer who plays as a goalkeeper for Italian  club Reggina, on loan from Napoli.

Club career

Youth career
Contini was born in Cherkasy, Ukraine to an Italian father originally from Naples, Italy and a Ukrainian mother. When Contini was three years old, he moved with his family to Giugliano in Campania, Italy.
He started his football career at the age of five at Atletico Giugliano, a club his father was part of as a youth coach a young age who was a youth coach of Atletico Giugliano; he often ended up playing in teams with older boys as he moved up their youth ranks.

In 2007, Napoli played Atletico Giugliano in a friendly and Contini stood out with his performance and impressed then Napoli youth goalkeeping coach Luciano Tarallo. Later that year, he went on trial with Napoli and in 2008 he joined their youth system; in his first season at Napoli, he provided good performances and won the best goalkeeper award in the "Niccolò Galli" youth tournament in Florence and the "Cairo Montenotte" tournament in Savona, Italy. However, a serious knee injury (meniscus tear) following a clash with teammate Gennaro Tutino forced him to miss the remainder of the season.

After recovering from his injury, he made a full comeback with the youth team and took part at the renowned "Beppe Viola-Arco di Trento" youth tournament, where Contini played all the games and Napoli reached the final, then lost to Inter Milan; Contini went on to win the award for best goalkeeper of the tournament.

On 3 April 2013, Contini made his debut for the Primavera Under-19 team in a match against Lanciano, as a substitute, and immediately saved a penalty on his first game. In the 2013–14 season, Contini was also featured in the UEFA Youth League.

Napoli
His performances with the youth ranks did not go unnoticed, as Contini was called up by Xavi Valero, then goalkeeping coach of Napoli, to join the first team, being called up on many occasions during the 2014–15 season under Rafa Benitez.

Loan to SPAL
In July 2015, Contini moved to Spal on loan until the end of the 2015–16 season, in order to gain first team experience in the Italian thirrd division.

Loan to Virtus Entella
On 23 July 2019, he joined newly promoted Serie B club Virtus Entella on loan. He started Entella's season opener on 23 August 2019 against Livorno, making his debut in the second tier of Italian football.

Loans to Crotone and Vicenza
On 19 August 2021, he joined newly promoted Serie B club Crotone on loan. On 31 January 2022, he moved on loan to Vicenza.

Loan to Sampdoria
On 11 August 2022, Contini moved to Sampdoria on a season-long loan.

Loan to Reggina
On 13 January 2023, Contini joined Reggina on loan.

References

External links 
 
 Info of Contini in Italian
 Info of Contini in Italian 
 

1996 births
Living people
Sportspeople from Cherkasy
Ukrainian footballers
Italian footballers
Ukrainian people of Italian descent
Italian people of Ukrainian descent
Serie B players
Serie C players
S.S.C. Napoli players
Carrarese Calcio players
U.S. Città di Pontedera players
A.C.N. Siena 1904 players
Virtus Entella players
F.C. Crotone players
L.R. Vicenza players
U.C. Sampdoria players
Reggina 1914 players
Association football goalkeepers
People from Giugliano in Campania